Tonny Eyk, pseudonym of Teun Eikelboom, (The Hague, 4 July 1940) is a Dutch composer, arranger, pianist, bandleader, producer, entertainer, columnist and writer. His first book, Met Tonny Eyk naar de Provence (Go with Tonny Eyk to Provence), combines his love of the Tour de France and French gastronomy. Eyk is also an ambassador of the Dutch company . Eyk graduated by majoring in trombone at the Royal Conservatory in The Hague.

Biography

Tonny Eyk has made countless television appearances and has been involved with Dutch Television experienced from its very beginning. This includes Experimental TV in 1950, the opening of the second Dutch TV Net (1964), The first Color TV Broadcast (1967 from the Firato, the opening of the third Dutch TV Netherlands 3 (for which he wrote all the music) and the first Dutch advertising broadcast in 1963 (Mecom TV). Eyk has worked with world stars such as Dame Edna Everidge, Tommy Cooper, Toots Thielemans, Ringo Starr, The Three Degrees , Oleta Adams and Danny Kaye. He partnered his twin sister Jeanette, with whom he since 1947 an accordion duo had, in the European 1958 act for the legendary Rock and Roll King, "Bill Haley and his Comets" (the world's first pop concert was banned in the Netherlands).

With Rudi Carrell, Eyk made a tour for the Dutch troops In 1962 in New Guinea, and later in 1980 he was the musical director for Rudi's TV shows in Germany, including “Die Sieben Verflixte” and “Rudi's Urlaub Show. In 1980, Tonny Eyk performed with his combo at the inauguration of Beatrix as queen of The Netherlands and again in 2005, at her 25-year jubilee reign at the Knight's Hall (Ridderzaal) of Dutch States General States General of the Netherlands of the Netherlands parliament (Staten-Generaal van het Koninkrik der Nederlanden) in the Binnenhof in The Hague. 
Tonny Eyk has made  hundreds of compositions both in the light and in the classical music genres. Also he composed symphonic works, such as the  Suite (for Jaap van Zweden) and Capriccio for symphony orchestra and Combo commissioned by the Holland Festival '79. For decades the "Anthem Ceremony Protoculaire UCI" played during all cycling world championships was a composition by Tonny Eyk.

The Two Jeateux

The musical career of Tonny Eyk started in 1947. This name was a combination of their own two names. In 1950 they made their radio debut in the VARA 'Amateurs zetten hun beste beentje voor’ (Amateurs put their best foot forward) program and they followed this with a performance for the then Dutch experimental television project in Eindhoven. They first worked abroad in 1952 and played in a movie theatre in Liège performing between the news and the featured film. In 1954, Jeanette and Eyk made a tour of Italy with their accordion teacher .

At the age of 14, exactly on 1 July 1955, the duo became professional. That year, on 12 November, they were seen for the first time on television in the NCRV program 'Blokband’ and as a result of this, they were invited to perform on the highly popular radio show of  : "Alle hens aan dek met Mastklimmen” (All hands on deck with Mast Climbing). They appeared regularly with their accordion act in many variety shows and also for Dutch soldiers (including La Courtine) and went on tour for Belgian soldiers stationed in Germany. Eyk also accompanied as pianist various jugglers, comedians, singers, magicians and clowns. In 1957, the duo received a contract with the famous Heck's Lunchroom on Amsterdam's Rembrandtplein (Rembrand Square) and in 1959 their first record was released by Delahaye Records.

In addition to performances with  Eyk performed a lot of solo work. He did gigs in nightclubs and worked as a pianist in the orchestra of the then-popular singer . In 1960 in Italy, Eyk scored a hit with the song “Addio Piccolina” (sung by ). From 1963 Tonny Eyk conducted various radio ensembles including VARA Musette Orchestra and Koffiekamer Sounds (NCRV). He formed the Tonny Eyk-Qwartet with Eddy Christiani as vocalist and guitarist.

Solo career

In 1964, Tonny Eyk married Elizabeth Vasbinder, a former dancer of the Dutch and Dutch National Ballet. Eyk was also the supervisor for the popular duo Willy Alberti and Willeke Alberti.

He gave concerts for Dutch emigrants in Australia, New Zealand, United States, Canada, Curacao, Suriname and in South Africa. At this time Eyk was increasingly in demand for TV programs and he became the musical director of some legendary programs, including ‘Voor de Vuist Weg’ and ‘Muziekmozaïek’ (with Willem Duys), Mies Bouwman, ‘Nieuwe Oogst’ (New Harvest), the Ronnie Tober Shows, ‘’, ‘de KRO komt langs’, ‘’, the ‘1-2-3-show', the Carré Shows, ‘De show van de Maand’, ‘Werk in Uitvoering’ (with Willem Nijholt). He was also responsible for many children's series such as ‘Bibelebons’, ‘, ‘’, ‘’, ‘’, ‘Thomas en Senior’, ‘Mijn Idee’ and many others. He also composed the music for among others the TV series ‘Kant aan mijn Broek’, ‘Vanoude mensen de dingen die voorbij gaan’, ‘de Verossing’ and for : ‘Vamos a Ver’.

Eyk appeared during the FIFA World Cup in 1974 for the Dutch national team in Germany where coach Rinus Michels sang ‘Dreamland’ for his players

At the request of Mr. Pieter van Vollenhoven, Tonny Eyk became part of the grand piano group ‘Gevleugelds Vrienden’. He also accompanied Princess Juliana singing two cabaret songs on a single.

Eyk conducted the "Gala of the Century' (100 years Royal Theatre Carré) and made record and CD recordings with  Big Band, Alex Hare, The Blue Diamonds, AVRO's children's choir, the Wamas and many more. Eyk was very popular with the KRO television program ‘’, He was also chairman of the jury of the ‘’. With lyricist Herman Pieter de Boer, Eyk wrote hits for ‘Kinderen voor Kinderen’ (Children for Children). Also for the cinematic film Soul Mate (with André van Duin), he wrote the music and Eyk accompanied Hans Teeuwen in his film ‘Gewoon Hans’. For the AVRO television program ‘’, Eyk was for many years a participant and referee.
From 1990, Tonny Eyk made many performances abroad. They travelled the world over (Curacao, Chicago, China, Japan, Malaysia) and made various television recordings including ‘The Big Buffet Show’ in Singapore. In Shanghai Eyk in 2005 made videos for his children's hits (‘Op een onbewoond eiland’-On a desert island and Ik heb zo waanzinnig gedroomd- I had such a crazy dream’. These numbers were even sung in Chinese by the Shanghai TV children's choir. In 2011, his composition ‘Capriccio' for Strings was performed by The Fancy Fiddlers and in St. Petersburg by the St.Petersburg Chamber Orchestra 'Carpe Diem'.

Collector

Eyk is a big cycling fan and is internationally known as a collector of cycling jerseys (only champion and ranking jerseys). This large collection was in 2010 exhibited by the ‘Lotto’ ( Lottery) in the Library of Rotterdam. Moreover, he has a unique collection of cookbooks.

Television music

Tonny Eyk writes tunes for many television programs and performs regularly with other famous artists. He is best known for the theme tune of the NOS Studio Sport program and for compositions for ‘Van Kooten en de Bie’.

TV Tunes
For the following Dutch television he wrote the theme song;
 1962 - 1963 Wilde Ganzen
 1968 - 1970 Scala (NTS)
 1968 - 1970 Doebiedoe
 1970 - 1988 AVRO's TopPop
 1972 - 1989 Klassewerk
 1972 - heden NOS Studio Sport
 1973 - 1983 
 1978 - 1989 Klassewerk
 1978 - NOS-theme song
 1979 - 1985 AVRO's Puzzeluur
 1980 - 1986 1-2-3-show
 1981 - 1985 
 1981 - 1992 Teleac-theme song
 1985 - 1993 
 1986 - 1988 Brandpunt (televisieprogramma)
 1986 - 1995 
 1988 - 1994 -theme song
 1989 - 1996 Boggle
 1989 - Socutera-theme song
 1993 - 1994 Meer op Zondag (NOS)
 1993 - 1998 Kookgek
 1994 - 1995

Foreign TV Tunes
For the next German television he wrote the theme song;
 1984 - 1987 (WDR)
 1985 - 1990 Kinder in der Kiste (ARD)
 1987 - 1988 Die Oma-Opa-Mama-Papa Guck Mal Show (WDR)
 1991 - 1997 Rudi's Lacharchiv 
 1993 - The Post Has Gone (RTL)
         Rudigramme (RTL)
 1992 - 1993 Rudi's Tierschow

Orchestra Leader
For the following TV programs Tonny Eyk was the conductor;

 1963 - 1965 Kijk die Rijk
 1964 - 1965 Johnny & Rijk shows
 1966 - 1967 De Ronnie Tober-shows
 1966 - 1979 
 1968 - 1969 De Max Tailleur-shows
 1974 - 1976 Muziekmozaïek
 1974 - 1985 
 1975 - 1980 Bij Ons In....
 1978        Netwerk
 1979 - 1981 Telebingo
 1980 - 1981 De K.R.O. Komt Langs In
 1981 - 1982 Mies
 1983 - 1984 Nieuwe Oogst
 1980 - 1986 
 1985 - 1986 De Willem Nijholt shows
 1989        Harten-Gala's
             De Carré-shows (Variété-shows, 8-delige serie AVRO)

Other music for TV 

 1972 - 1975 Bibelebons
 1974 - 1975 De stille kracht
 1974 - 1975 De verlossing
 1974 - 1998 Van Kooten en De Bie
 1975 - 1976 
 1975 - 1978 De Holle Bolle Boom
 1977 - 1978 Hollands Glorie
 1977 - 1979 De Luchtbus
 1978 - 1979 Kant aan m'n broek
 1979 - 1980 De Boris en Bramshow
 1980 - 1985 De Poppenkraam
 1980 - 1990 Kinderen voor Kinderen
 1982 - 1983 De Zevensprong
 1983 - 1984 Willem van Oranje
 1983 - 1997 Hints
 1984 - 1985 Knokken voor twee
 1984 - 1990 Mini-playbackshow
 1985 - 1988 Thomas en Senior
 1985 - 1991 Mijn idee
 1988  Jingles en Tunes Nederland 3

Film Music 

 1973 - Nummer 14
 1976 - Peter en de vliegende autobus
 1979 - Martijn en de Magiër
 1980 - De Bende van Hiernaast
 1982 - De Boezemvriend
 1982 - Knokken voor twee
 1985 - Maria
 1989 - Kunst- en Vliegwerk
 2009 -  (with Hans Teeuwen)

Writer

Tonny Eyk is also a writer. He has published five books on France. He also writes articles in various magazines, including the magazine ‘Zakenreis’ (Business trip), ‘De Wijnkrant’ en ‘Côte & Provence’. For 22 years he wrote articles for the former newspaper ‘Het Nieuws van de Dag’. For many years, he has a column in the daily newspaper De Telegraaf. During the Tour de France he wrote daily columns.

Commissioned by Buma / Stemra, he wrote "The Forgotten Chapter" (the Dutch Variety). For Princess Appliances he published several culinary books. (‘Lounging with Princess’ and ‘Vitamin Festival’).

He has written several other books.
 2000 - Richting Zuiden (Direction South)
 2000 - Een Weekend Weg met Tonny Eyk (A Weekend Away with Tonny Eyk)
 2002 - Leve het Goede Leven in Frankrijk (Long Live the Good Life in France)
 2004 - Frankrijk en Route (France en Route)
 2007 - Het Nieuwe Reisboek Richting Zuiden (The New travel book going South)
 2010 - Smullen en Genieten in Frankrijk (Taste and enjoy in France)

References

External links
Extended Biography (Dutch)
Musical Encyclopedia of Tonny Eyk (Dutch)
Famous National and International 12" Releases

1940 births
Living people
Dutch pop pianists
Musicians from The Hague
Dutch accordionists
21st-century accordionists
21st-century pianists